A virtual self is a virtual concept of self in philosophy, sociology and artificial intelligence.

virtual self, in Virtual Human Interaction Lab

Virtual Self may refer to:
The Virtual Self, book by journalist Nora Young on social media and digital information 2012
Alias of Porter Robinson
Virtual Self (EP) by Virtual Self, 2017